Johanna Elsig (born 1 November 1992) is a German footballer. She plays as a defender for Montpellier.

Club career
Johanna Elsig began her junior career at FC Düren-Niederau 08 before signing a senior contract with Bayer 04 Leverkusen in 2009. In 2012, she signed with 1. FFC Turbine Potsdam.

International goal
Scores and results list Germany's goal tally first:

Honours

Club
1. FFC Turbine Potsdam
DFB-Hallenpokal for women: Winner 2013, 2014

International
Germany
UEFA Women's Under-19 Championship: Winner 2011
UEFA Women's Under-17 Championship: Winner 2009

Individual
Fritz Walter Medal: Gold 2011

References

External links

Johanna Elsig at Soccerdonna.de 

1992 births
Living people
German women's footballers
German expatriate women's footballers
Germany women's international footballers
1. FFC Turbine Potsdam players
Bayer 04 Leverkusen (women) players
People from Düren
Sportspeople from Cologne (region)
Women's association football defenders
Frauen-Bundesliga players
2. Frauen-Bundesliga players
Footballers from North Rhine-Westphalia
2019 FIFA Women's World Cup players
Montpellier HSC (women) players
Division 1 Féminine players
German expatriate sportspeople in France
Expatriate women's footballers in France